The Croatan were an Algonkian tribe living in what is now the Carolinas.

Croatan may also mean:
Croatan Beach, Virginia Beach, Virginia, neighborhood of Virginia Beach
Croatan Sound, an inlet on the North Carolina coast
Croatan National Forest, a national forest in North Carolina
Croatan High School, a public secondary school near Croatan National Forest
USS Croatan, two American aircraft carriers of that name
Croatan (World of Darkness), an extinct tribe of werewolves in the roleplaying game Werewolf: The Apocalypse
Croatan, a 2005 studio album by Philadelphia metal band Starkweather released by Candlelight Records in 2006

See also
Croatoan (disambiguation)
Croatian (disambiguation)